Michael Hoke Austin (February 17, 1910 – November 23, 2005) was an American golf professional and kinesiology expert, specializing in long drives.

He was credited by Guinness World Records with hitting the longest drive in tournament play (471m/515 yards) in 1974 at Winterwood Golf Course (the Par-4 455-yard 14th Hole now called Desert Rose Golf Course) in Las Vegas, Nevada.

Biography
Austin was born in Guernsey. By the time he was four years-old, he had moved with his family to London and then Scotland. They later emigrated to the United States, where they settled firstly in Florida and finally Georgia.  
Social Security records refute these biographical entries.  They reflect that Michael Hoke Austin was born 17 Feb. 1910 and died (aged 95) on 23 Nov. 2005.  His father was born in Alabama and there are no records reflecting English or Scottish claims.

During the Depression, Austin ran a local golf shop in Atlanta during the summer. In the winter he frequented the courses farther south in Florida playing big money games against vacationing gangsters from Chicago. After the first year, they wouldn't bet against him so he found a set of left-handed clubs and played with that handicap. The next year he played one-handed. It is also said he won a $5,000 bet by making par by hitting the ball with a Coke bottle. Through these hustles he acquired the moniker of "The Golfing Bandit."

Austin also traveled across the country performing trick shots and challenging anyone to try to outdrive him. He said he could hit a variety of shots with an ordinary set of golf clubs. He told a biographer that he "lived like a maharaja" during that time.  Austin's biographer, Philip Reed, wrote that when Sam Snead first received a set of steel shafted clubs he promptly gave them to Austin saying, "You're the only one who swings fast enough to hit these."

Moving to Hollywood
In the late 1930s, Austin moved to Los Angeles to become a pro at the Wilshire Country Club. When he arrived, the job fell through so he worked at other golf courses, teaching and competing. His roommate was Errol Flynn and they frequented local nightclubs in search of women. Austin also auditioned for roles in movies and eventually appeared in a number of motion pictures. However, his golfing and acting were put on hold when he joined the service. Having never completed U.S. citizenship, he went to Canada and joined the R.A.F.

Austin established a name for himself as a golf teacher and was eventually sought out by Howard Hughes for lessons. He eventually established a gym in Hollywood where he taught boxing, tennis, baseball and golf. The walls of the gym were covered with mirrors which he said sped up the learning process. When he gave lectures about golf he dressed in a tight-fitting black leotard with white outlines of the skeletal structure. He wanted students to see how the bones were positioned in the correct golf swing.  Austin also appeared/acted in the Michael Douglas movie "Star Chamber" as Judge Lang.  Austin's wife Tanya also was in the movies.  She appeared in the movie "The Blues Brothers." Austin also had a voice good enough to sing light opera.  He would occasionally break out in song at, some say, the most awkward of moments.  Austin also spoke several languages.

Setting the World Record
For years Austin was well known by professional golfers for his length off the tee. But it was one drive in 1974 that secured his name in history. While playing in the U.S. National Seniors Tournament, at the Winterwood Golf Course (now the Desert Rose) Austin was put in a foursome with PGA Champion Chandler Harper. After hitting several 400-yard drives, Chandler said, "Mike, let's see you really let one go." Austin drove the green on 450-yard par 4. It carried to the edge of the green, bounced over and rolled past the pin and off the back edge. In a 2003 interview, Chandler said he found a ball on the next tee box and called to Austin, "This is impossible, but there is a ball over here." They identified the ball as Austin's and stepped off the distance back to the center of the green. The drive was 515 yards.  GBWW no longer recognizes the world's longest drive in their book.

Several factors make this record feat especially amazing, although there was a tailwind estimated at 25 mph.  The drive was done on level ground, using a persimmon wood driver with 10 degrees of loft and a 43.5" extra-stiff steel shaft, the ball was a soft balata and Mike Austin was 64 years old.  The improved technology of today should achieve far greater distances in the same conditions.

The Mike Austin Swing

Austin's golf swing, known as The Mike Austin Swing, has been practiced and taught by numerous golf professionals. It is based on the principle of "supple quickness", whereby speed is generated through relaxation of all active muscles. Austin demonstrated the power of the swing by securing the world long drive title with a 515-yard shot, using a steel-shafted persimmon wood driver, a balata-covered ball and had a 27-mph tail wind, while playing in the U.S. National Seniors Open in 1974. He was 64 years old at the time.

The Austin swing breaks from standard Professional Golf Association teaching in a number of ways:

 The hips slide laterally rather than turning.
 The clubhead is thrown from the top of the swing, not released at the last moment. 
 The golfer bends forward from the hips rather than bending with the knees.

Austin designed his golf swing to use the joints of the body in the way they designed. He claimed that his swing did not cause back injuries which are so common among professional golfers. Late in his career, Austin changed his hand motion to a counter-rotation of the forearms that keeps the club facing the target throughout the swing.

Students of Austin include World Long Drive Champion Mike Dunaway and Jaacob Bowden. Speaking about Austin, Dunaway said "He is the dean of all golf instruction from the beginning of time, as far as I'm concerned."

Instructors
Golf instructors who have taught Austin's swing include:

Mike Dunaway
Walter "Smiley" Jones
Dan Shauger
Jaacob Bowden, winner of the 2003 Pinnacle Distance Challenge with a televised 381-yard drive and multiple winner of qualifiers for the RE/MAX World Long Drive Championship, including one that set a grid record of 421 yards.
Betsy Cullen, former LPGA Tour winner
Heiko Falke, Mike Austin teacher since 2005, brand owner in Germany
John Marshall, 2005–06 ALDA Super Senior National Long Driving Champion and a five-time RE/MAX World Long Drive Championship finalist.
Steve Pratt
Deb Vangellow

Instructional and related materials
Austin talked about setting the world record and revealed his secrets for hitting it long and straight in his video Golf is Mental Imagery and Austinology.
 His last instructional DVD was with Mike Dunaway, Mike Austin: Secrets of the Game's Longest Hitter, and was produced by Peace River Golf. Also featured in the video are Dan Shauger, Smiley Jones, Philip Reed, and Jaacob Bowden.

References

American male golfers
Golfers from California
1910 births
2005 deaths
British emigrants to the United States